Acalolepta longicollis is a species of beetle in the family Cerambycidae. It was described by E. Forrest Gilmour in 1956. It is known from Nepal.

References

Acalolepta
Beetles described in 1956